The 84th Assembly District of Wisconsin is one of 99 districts in the Wisconsin State Assembly.  Located in southeast Wisconsin, the district comprises part of the southwest corner of Milwaukee County.  It contains the city of Greenfield and the village of Hales Corners, as well as parts of the village of Greendale and several blocks of the southwest reaches of the city of Milwaukee.  The district is represented by Republican Bob Donovan, since January 2023.

The 84th Assembly District is located within Wisconsin's 28th Senate district, along with the 82nd and 83rd Assembly districts.

List of past representatives

References 

Wisconsin State Assembly districts
Milwaukee County, Wisconsin
Waukesha County, Wisconsin